

See also 
 United States House of Representatives elections, 1808 and 1809
 List of United States representatives from Tennessee

Notes 

1809
Tennessee
United States House of Representatives